Developmental Origins of Health and Disease (abbreviated DOHaD) is an approach to medical research emphasizing the role of prenatal and perinatal exposure to environmental factors, such as undernutrition, in determining the development of human diseases in adulthood. This approach includes an emphasis on epigenetic causes of adult chronic diseases, including the potential for such environmental causes to influence disease risk across generations. As well as physical human disease, the psychopathology of the fetus can also be predicted by epigenetic factors.

Origin
The DOHaD approach originated in studies by David Barker and his colleagues, which showed a strong relationship between infant mortality rates from 1921 to 1925 and ischemic heart disease rates from 1968 to 1978. This led to the fetal origins hypothesis of the origins of adult diseases, which proposed that this relationship was caused by differences in early life nutrition, with a supporting theory that birthweight is connected to the development of chronic disease. This in turn led to greater interest in the roles of developmental plasticity and early life environmental exposures in adult disease. The World Congress on Fetal Origins of Adult Disease held two meetings – one in 2001 and the other in 2003 – summarizing then-new research in these areas. This congress later evolved into the International Society for Developmental Origins of Health and Disease. The CDC also noticed how the nutritional habits of mothers can cause disease in their offspring. "During the Dutch Hunger Winter Famine (1944-1945) mothers were not able to receive the proper nutrition needed to healthily carry a baby. The babies who were born during this time or directly after this time developed diseases such as heart disease, schizophrenia, and Type 2 diabetes. Researchers were able to determine decades after the famine that the babies born during this time had an increase in methylation in some genes and a decrease in methylation in other genes compared to their siblings who were not born during the famine." The methylation levels explain why these individuals were predisposed to certain diseases.

The Dutch Hunger Winter Study 
In the western regions of the Netherlands and in Amsterdam, a famine broke out due to a railway strike and German control limiting supplies. The people of these countries were receiving extremely limited calories (around 400-800 a day) which had an extreme effect on pregnant women and their children. The Dutch Hunger Winter study provided significant data to support the DOHaD. Results concluded that the women with low caloric and nutritional intake during pregnancy had children that had grater rates of obesity as opposed to those who were not exposed to famine. This is conclusive with the DOHaD theory. The study goes on to investigate at what points in development did the DOHaD stand true. It is thought that exposure to famine in early gestational periods have a greater effect on the fetus, however, these theories are still under investigation.

Examples of Health and Disease

Cardiovascular Disease 
In his study done by David Barker, found a strong connection between poor prenatal environment and increased possibility of cardiovascular diseases in adults. He found a direct correlation between infant mortality in 1921-25 and mortality rates in 1968-78 because of heart diseases in England. In areas where pregnant mothers had to face poor nutritional state, their newborn children were at a high risk of death. If they survived the early ages of life, they had developed a higher risk of cardiovascular diseases.

Studies on rats found that maternal nutrient restriction resulted in damage to the cardiac renin-angiotensin system (which regulates blood pressure and volume). Additionally, these studies have shown a decrease in the number of nephrons produced by the offspring of these mothers. These differences have been found to affect males and females differently, at least in the early stages. The exact mechanism of action is unknown but is believe that it is epigenetic.

Metabolic Function/Disease 
A study done at UC Irvine looked at the impact that maternal stress has on fetal development and overall fetal health. The researchers determined that the mothers' stress and adverse pregnancy outcomes (APOs) related to the length of gestation and growth of the fetus along with impacts on the endocrine and immune systems of the fetus.

Early life influences, both prenatal and postnatal, have important effects on children later in life. It was determined that breastfed infants have significantly lower risks of obesity later in life than infants that were formula-fed.

Nutrition and growth during the early years of life can be related to the growth of diseases in humans later in their lives. For example, a study done in Jamaica showed that the blood pressure of children was associated with the mother's hemoglobin levels and body fat during pregnancy. Another example of this is shown in an article from the New England Journal of Medicine which takes place during the Dutch famine. This study concluded that those who were in utero at the time of the famine were at a greater risk of obesity, hypertension, and heart disease than those who were born before or after the famine.

References 

Medical terminology
Epigenetics